The Early College at Guilford (ECG) is a public magnet high school with approximately 200 students located in Greensboro, North Carolina. The school was started in 2002 as a partnership between Guilford College and Guilford County Schools as the first early college high school in North Carolina, allowing students to graduate with a high school diploma and up to two years of college credit from Guilford College.

The mission of The Early College at Guilford is to make a positive difference in the lives of students by providing exceptionally challenging educational opportunities that support academic development at the highest standards.  Through building bridges at the earliest opportunity between high school, college, and beyond, the Early College at Guilford seeks to awaken and mature the creative, social, and academic abilities of students.  The school strives to foster multi-dimensional leadership in varied contexts so that students may succeed in higher education and the changing world beyond. 

The Early College at Guilford offers a writing-intensive, fast-paced curriculum. In 9th and 10th grade, students take honors and Advanced Placement courses. Eleventh and twelfth graders are enrolled in Guilford College courses and take courses taught directly by Guilford College professors alongside Guilford College students. Generally, only two courses at the college level - English and Physical Science - are necessary to fulfill their high school graduation requirements. All other college courses are electives. A college professor serves as their academic advisor, helping them choose among the college’s offerings. In the spirit of Guilford’s liberal arts mission, students explore all areas of the college’s curriculum. Each semester students select courses that bridge at least two academic divisions and three academic departments.

The cost of tuition for all Guilford College courses is covered by both Guilford County Schools and the state of North Carolina via funding through the Innovative Education Initiatives Act.

Academics

Students at the Early College at Guilford follow a rigorous academic schedule throughout all four years. Underclassmen (freshmen and sophomores) take almost all honors and AP classes. Classes are taught on a modified block schedule with holidays that align with Guilford County Schools’ schedule. Most students say that sophomore year is the hardest with a very rigorous schedule. That year, students can take up to 7 AP courses in both semesters, with AP US History, AP Environmental Science, AP English Language and Composition as required courses and electives including AP Calculus AB, AP Calculus BC, AP Psychology and AP Statistics. Freshmen are required to take the PSAT while sophomores are required to take the PSAT, the Pre-ACT and the March SAT. The AP Exam pass rate in 2022 was 99%.

Upperclassmen are dually enrolled in both the Guilford County school system as juniors (and then seniors), and in Guilford College as freshmen (and then sophomores in their second year). Often, the number of AP Classes taken as underclassmen allows students to register as sophomores and juniors at Guilford College. Juniors and seniors take Guilford College classes, which count towards their remaining high school credits, and can often be transferred to other educational institutions. If a student remains at Guilford College after graduating from the Early College, the credits they received for their two final years will transfer towards their undergraduate requirements. 

Students are not ranked at ECG in order to foster cooperation and collaboration among students and to allow students to focus on learning material.  Student GPA is calculated per North Carolina state guidelines on a standard 4 point scale with an extra 0.5 quality point given for honors courses and an extra 1.0 quality point for AP or college courses.

Academic Achievement

In 2022, the average SAT score was 1468 of 1600, the highest of all North Carolina public high schools. In 2021, the average SAT score was 1452 of 1600, again the highest of all North Carolina public high schools. 

The Early College at Guilford was ranked 35th nationally by U.S. News & World Report in 2022 as well as the best public school in North Carolina and the #9 STEM school in the United States.
  

Newsweek ranked the Early College at Guilford 7th on its annual list of the top 500 STEM High Schools in 2020. In 2010, Newsweek magazine listed ECG as one of "The Nation's Most Elite Public High Schools". Newsweek also ranked ECG at 5th on its annual list of America's Best High Schools in 2016, making it the top high school in North Carolina in 2016. 

The Early College at Guilford has about one-fourth of its students each year named as semi-finalists for the National Merit Scholarship. Scholarships and awards received by the Class of 2022 totaled $7,966,612.

Demographics

During the 2022–2023 school year, there were 199 students enrolled at ECG, approximately 50 in each year of high school.  The students were 56% female and 44% male with 51% Asian American, 30% White, and 11% African American.

All students are residents of Guilford County and the students selected for the freshman class were chosen through a combination of academic, extracurricular and leadership characteristics, academic testing and personal interviews that were held on the ECG campus.   For the class of 2026, there were approximately 575 applications submitted for the freshman class.

Extracurricular Activities

Despite the small class size of ECG, there are a large number of clubs that are available for students.  Both underclassmen and upperclassmen participate in Early College clubs, usually held after underclassmen classes. Competition clubs include Battle of the Books, Chess, Code, Economic Challenge, National History Day, Health Occupations Students of America (HOSA), Math, Mock Trial, Model UN, Quiz Bowl, one FIRST Robotics Competition and four FIRST Tech Challenge teams (under the umbrella of ECG Robotics, Inc.), and Science Olympiad 

Service clubs include ECG Active, Environmental, Interact, Red Cross, Campus Life and Student Human Relations Coalition. Students also participate in two tutoring clubs called RISE and EducateUS. Interest clubs include Data Analytics and Cybersecurity, International, Mental Health Advocacy, Publishing and Theater.

One hundred percent of the Class of 2022 completed 100 or more hours of community service and earned the Guilford County Schools’ Service Learning Exemplary Awards.

Extracurricular Awards and Recognition
The “Joe Childers Scholastic Cup,” sponsored by The North Carolina Association for Scholastic Activities (NCASA), is given each year to the “top large and small high school” in the state based on accumulating points in a set of scholastic competitions, including the seven NCASA competitions and eleven “Cup Partner” competitions.
In 2022, ECG not only claimed the Joe Childers Cup for small high schools but was also announced as the state champion for Quiz Bowl, National History Day, The Twelve, and The Economics Challenge.   ECG also claimed the Joe Childers Cup in 2021.

National History Day: First place state winners in the Senior individual website category.  Two ECG teams qualified for the Small School National Tournament in 2022.

Quiz Bowl: State champions in 2022; 4th place in 2021.

Science Olympiad: Division C: 5th place in North Carolina in 2022; 12th place in 2021.

The Economics Challenge: First place in 2022

The Twelve: State champions in 2021-22. and 4th place in 2021.

Robotics
ECG Robotics is a student-led, non-profit robotics club based in Greensboro, NC. The five teams compete in the FIRST Robotics Competition (one team) and FIRST Tech Challenge (four teams) and welcome students from all over Guilford County. 

Triple Strange (FRC Team 1533) was established in Greensboro, North Carolina in 2004. It is currently the only FRC team in ECG Robotics. The team has 3 state championships, as well as winning its division at the world championship in 2018.

Wannabee Strange (FTC Team 731) is a 12 year team that has received the Inspire award in the last 2 years, qualified for the World Championship for 4 years and in 2019 received a robot design nomination. 

Back to the Drawing Board (FTC Team 5795) was founded in 2013 and has been to the World Championship three times.  2016 started 5795’s 3 year Worlds’ attendance. During FIRST RES-Q, Team 5795 won the Inspire Award at all qualifiers and the state competition. Team 5795 was also the Finalist Alliance 2nd Pick at States and the Winning Alliance 2nd Pick at Southern Super-Regional. Advancing to Worlds, 5795 also placed 30th in the Edison Division as well as Top 2% Overall. In 2017 VELOCITY VORTEX, 5795 won both the Think Award as well as the Inspire Award at all qualifiers and the state competition. At Southern Super-Regionals, 5795 won 2nd Place Inspire along with the 1st place Rockwell Collins Innovate Award. In Worlds, 5795 was a Promote Award and PTC Design Award Finalist and placed 13th out of 52 teams in their division. 

The Thunderducks (FTC Team 6183) team has been able to consistently qualify for the North Carolina State Competition since 2014. In the 2020-2021 season, the team qualified for States at our first qualifier in the NC Remote Qualifier #5, won the 2nd place Inspire Award in NC Remote Qualifier #5, won the 1st place Design Award in NC Remote Qualifier #5 and won the 3rd place Motivate Award in NC Remote Qualifier #8.

The Night Owls (FTC Team 10195) was first created in 2015 and is currently in their fifth year. Throughout their history, experienced members have left, and new and enthusiastic individuals have come to fill their place. The Night Owls consist of a mixture of ECG students as well as students from other schools around Greensboro such as STEM Early College and Greensboro Day School.

Principals
Tony Lamair Burks II (2002–2006)
Charles Blanchard (2006–2009)
Bobby Hayes (2009–2014)
Linda Kidd (2015–2018)
Angela Polk-Jones (2019–2020)
Pete Zachary Kashubara III (2020–Present)

References

External links
 Current Early College website
 Guilford County School District
 ECG School Profile

Public high schools in North Carolina
Guilford College
Educational institutions established in 2002
Magnet schools in North Carolina
2002 establishments in North Carolina